Two highways in the U.S. state of California have been signed as Route 6:
U.S. Route 6 in California
California State Route 6 (1934), now part of I-10